Christopher George Holm (born November 27, 1984) is an American former professional basketball player in Japan. He is an assistant coach for the Kyoto Hannaryz.

Career statistics 

|-
| align="left" |  2008–09
| align="left" | Sendai
| 52 || 52 ||34.2  ||.514  ||.250  || .588 ||bgcolor="CFECEC"|15.6*  || 2.1 || 0.8 ||1.1  ||  15.0
|-
| align="left" | 2009–10
| align="left" | Sendai
| 52 || 52 ||32.1  ||.526  ||.000  ||.629  ||13.8  ||2.3  ||0.8  ||1.3  || 12.9
|-
| align="left" |  2010–11
| align="left" | Sendai
| 36 || 33 ||32.6  ||.565  ||.000  ||.643  ||13.4  ||1.9  || 1.2 ||0.8  || 14.4
|-
| align="left" |  2011–12
| align="left" | Niigata
| 52 || 43 ||29.8  || .579 || .000 || .647 ||bgcolor="CFECEC"|14.3*  ||1.9  || 1.0 || 0.9 ||  11.5
|-
| align="left" |  2012–13
| align="left" | Niigata
| 52 || 51 || 30.2 || .579 || .000 || .649 ||bgcolor="CFECEC"| 14.5* || 2.2 || .9 || .9 ||  11.3
|-
| align="left" |  2013–14
| align="left" | Kyoto
| 52 ||51  || 29.1 || .543 || --- || .615 || 11.8 || 1.3 || .9 || 1.0 ||  9.1
|-
| align="left" |  2014–15
| align="left" | Shiga
|52 || ||20.7 ||.588 ||.000 ||.553 ||8.7 || 1.3||0.6 ||0.8 ||6.6
|-

References

1984 births
Living people
American expatriate basketball people in Bosnia and Herzegovina
American expatriate basketball people in Japan
American expatriate basketball people in Spain
American men's basketball players
Basketball coaches from Nevada
Basketball players from Nevada
Dakota Wizards players
George Washington Colonials men's basketball coaches
Kyoto Hannaryz players
Niigata Albirex BB players
Rhode Island Rams men's basketball players
Sendai 89ers players
Shiga Lakes players
Vermont Catamounts men's basketball players